The Valparaiso Beacons football program is the intercollegiate American football team for Valparaiso University located in the U.S. state of Indiana. The team competes in the NCAA Division I Football Championship Subdivision (FCS) as a member of the Pioneer Football League (PFL). Valparaiso's first football team was fielded in 1919. The team plays its home games at the 5,000-seat Brown Field in Valparaiso, Indiana. Landon Fox has served as the team's head coach since 2019. Valparaiso was known as the Crusaders through the 2019 season.

History

Classifications
1941–1972: NCAA College Division
1973–1978: NCAA Division III
1979–1992: NCAA Division II
1993–present: NCAA Division I–AA/FCS

Conference memberships
 1919–1923: Independent
 1924–1925: Western Interstate Conference
 1926–1933: Independent
 1934–1947: Indiana Intercollegiate Conference
 1948–1950: Independent
 1951–1977: Indiana Collegiate Conference
 1978–1989: Heartland Collegiate Conference
 1990–1992: Midwest Intercollegiate Football Conference
 1993–present: Pioneer Football League

Year-by-year results

Bowl game appearances

Championships

Conference championships 

† Co-champions

Divisional championships
From 2001 to 2005, the Pioneer Football League (PFL) was divided into North and South Divisions. As winners of the PFL's North Division, Valparaiso has made one appearance in the Pioneer Football League Championship Game, in 2003.

† Co-champions

References

External links
 

 
American football teams established in 1919
1919 establishments in Indiana